Gubdor is a rural locality (a selo) in Krasnovishersky District, Perm Krai, Russia. The population was 71 as of 2010. There are 7 streets.

Geography 
Gubdor is located 38 km southwest of Krasnovishersk (the district's administrative centre) by road. Rategova is the nearest rural locality.

References 

Rural localities in Krasnovishersky District